HCL Commerce (formerly known as WebSphere Commerce and WCS (WebSphere Commerce Suite)) is a software platform framework for e-commerce, including marketing, sales, customer and order processing functionality in a tailorable, integrated package. It is a single, unified platform which offers the ability to do business directly with consumers (B2C), with businesses (B2B), indirectly through channel partners (indirect business models), or all of these simultaneously. WebSphere Commerce is built on the Java - Java EE platform using open standards, such as XML, and Web services. Formerly a product of IBM, the product was sold to HCL Technologies in July 2019.

WebSphere Commerce is sometimes referred to as WCS, however this abbreviation was originally used as a reference to the platform when it was named WebSphere Commerce Suite.  Use of the abbreviation continued with users after the platform was renamed to WebSphere Commerce with the announcement of WebSphere Commerce V5.4.

Versions
1. The first version of the platform was introduced in 1996,  during the emergence of e-commerce with a product called Net.Commerce  (V1.0 and subsequently V2.0, V3.1, and V3.2) that was first deployed to sell event tickets and merchandise for the 1996 Olympic Games. In 2001, Net.Commerce was renamed to WebSphere Commerce Suite, releasing versions V4.1 and V5.1. In 2002, WebSphere Commerce V5.4 was released, followed by V5.5 in 2003, V5.6 in 2004 and V5.6.1 in 2005. The latest major release versions are:
 Version 6.0 (2006)  
 Version 7.0 (2009) 
 Version 8.0 (2015) 
 Version 9.0 (2018)
 Version 9.1 (2020)

There are three editions of WebSphere Commerce software. Each edition provides an increasing set of functionality in comparison:
 Express (note: with the announcement of Version 8.0 the platform variants offered were simplified to Professional and Enterprise editions only.)
 Professional 
 Enterprise (note:  Enterprise edition was previously known as Business Edition prior to Version 6.0)

IBM provides an integrated development environment that is used to build and test customizations including changing the design of storefronts, extending business logic, and creating new business logic to meet business requirements. The developer platform is called IBM WebSphere Commerce Developer for which there are also 3 editions that pair with their runtime environments (i.e. WebSphere Commerce Developer Express, WebSphere Commerce Developer Professional, and WebSphere Commerce Developer Enterprise).

As with other customizable IBM products, the WebSphere Commerce Developer toolkit runs within IBM Rational Application Developer for WebSphere Software (RAD) as the foundation Java IDE, and RAD extends the Eclipse environment with visual and other development features.

A specific WebSphere Commerce version uses a specific version of RAD, for example:
 WebSphere Commerce Developer V6 is based on RAD V6
 WebSphere Commerce Developer V7 is based on either IBM Rational Software Architect (RSA) or RAD V7.5
 WebSphere Commerce Developer V8 is based on either RSA or RAD V9.5

Primary components of the software platform
WebSphere Commerce consists of 3 main components:
 a database
 an application server
 a web server

Databases which are supported with WebSphere Commerce V7 are:
 IBM Db2 on various platforms (i.e. Windows, AIX, Solaris, Linux, IBM i), provided with the product
 Oracle
 Apache Derby (for developer only, not supported in WCS v9), provided with the WebSphere Commerce Developer product.

Application server which is supported with WebSphere Commerce is IBM WebSphere Application Server, is also provided with the product.

Supported Web servers are:
 IBM HTTP Server, provided with the product
 Microsoft Internet Information Services (IIS)
 Sun Java System Web Server

Operating Systems
The following operating systems are supported for WebSphere Commerce V7:
 IBM AIX Version 7.1 (64–bit), IBM AIX Version 6.1 (64–bit), IBM AIX Version 5.3 (64–bit)
 Linux on IBM Power Systems, Linux on System x and other Intel-based processor systems, Linux on System z
 Red Hat Enterprise Linux
 SUSE Linux Enterprise Server
 (Oracle) Solaris 10 for SPARC
 Microsoft Windows Server 2008 (32 and 64–bit operating system), Microsoft Windows Server 2003 (32 and 64–bit operating system)
 IBM i V7.1 and IBM i V6.1

WebSphere Commerce Developer V7 supported operating systems:
 Windows 7 (since Fix Pack 7.0.0.2), Windows Vista, Windows XP, Windows Server 2003, Windows Server 2008

WebSphere Commerce Developer v9 not limited to Windows. However, Accelerator, Org Admin Console and WCS Admin Console still require Internet Explorer. Rational Application Developer will now run natively on IOS and Linux environments. https://www.ibm.com/support/knowledgecenter/en/SSZLC2_9.0.0/com.ibm.commerce.install.doc/refs/rigdevprereqclh.htm

Enhancements (new features)
WebSphere Commerce Feature Packs include new features (so called enhancements). These enhancements add some new functionality or features to the base product. Feature Pack differs from a fix pack, which is a set of correction fixes to the base code. Fix Packs and Feature Packs within a certain release are cumulative.

A Feature Pack contains multiple features that are installed as one package, and can be enabled individually. A feature provides a functional extension to the existing base product functionality.

Notes

E-commerce software
Commerce
Divested IBM products